This is a list of places on the Victorian Heritage Register in the Shire of Hindmarsh in Victoria, Australia. The Victorian Heritage Register is maintained by the Heritage Council of Victoria.

The Victorian Heritage Register, as of 2021, lists the following four state-registered places within the Shire of Hindmarsh:

References

Hindmarsh
+
+